Ceanothus thyrsiflorus, known as blueblossom or blue blossom ceanothus, is an evergreen shrub in the buckthorn family Rhamnaceae that is endemic to Oregon and California in the US. The term 'Californian lilac' is also applied to this and other varieties of ceanothus, though it is not closely related to Syringa, the true lilac.

Description
The clusters of tiny flowers, borne in spring, vary from different shades of blue to close to white.

Etymology
The Latin genus name Ceanothus is derived from the Ancient Greek,  ('spiny plant'). The name was originally used by Theophrastus for another plant, and Linnaeus reused it for Ceanothus.

The Latin specific epithet thyrsiflorus is derived from the Ancient Greek  (meaning a 'contracted panicle, wreath, or thyrsos') and the Latin  (gen. 'flower'), and so, thyrsiflorus means approximately 'with flowers arranged in the shape of a contracted panicle or thyrsos staff'.

Ecology
It is popular with birds, butterflies, and other pollinators. It is often visited by honeybees for its pollen.

Cultivation
Ceanothus thyrsiflorus has been used in gardens extensively. It prefers a warm, sheltered position in full sun. Several cultivars have been selected, including:
'Cascade' which may reach  of height
'El Dorado', a variegated cultivar with gold edge foliage and powder blue flowers 
'Repens Victoria', forming a sturdy evergreen mound and most useful groundcover with powder blue flowers
'Skylark', a tall type with blue flowers (this cultivar has gained the Royal Horticultural Society's Award of Garden Merit)
'Snow Flurry', with white flowers

References

External links

CalFlora Database: Ceanothus thyrsiflorus (blueblossom)
Jepson eFlora (TJM2):  Ceanothus thyrsiflorus
Ceanothus thyrsiflorus — U.C. Photo gallery

thyrsiflorus
Endemic flora of California
Flora of the Klamath Mountains
Natural history of the California chaparral and woodlands
Natural history of the California Coast Ranges
Natural history of the San Francisco Bay Area
Plants described in 1826
Taxa named by Johann Friedrich von Eschscholtz
Butterfly food plants
Garden plants of North America
Drought-tolerant plants
Flora without expected TNC conservation status